Dead Posey is an American rock band founded in Los Angeles, California by lead singer Danyell Souza  and guitarist/multi-instrumentalist Tony Fagenson.

The band has released three EP's via Sumerian Records/Position Music - Freak Show, Malfunction & Malfunction X Broken Down. The band has also released three new singles from their unreleased debut album - Russian Roulette, sorry i'm not dead and Can't Take Me Down.  Dead Posey has played notable festivals Download,  Louder Than Life, Aftershock and Shiprocked  as well as toured with bands such as Theory of a Deadman, Palaye Royale, Bones UK, Through Fire, BRKN Love & Saul.

Dead Posey's music has been featured in television shows such as Syfy's Wynonna Earp, Fox's Lucifer, MTV's Teen Wolf, Marvel's Cloak & Dagger, Netflix's Jack Whitehall: Travels With My Father, and Amazon's The Grand Tour, as well as in ads for Taco Bell, Sony PlayStation, Riot Games’ League of Legends. In 2019 their song "Don't Stop The Devil" was the theme song for WWE's Elimination Chamber. The band's song "Parasite" from the Malfunction EP made the 68 Best Rock Songs of 2020 by Loudwire. Dead Posey has received positive write ups from the likes of Spin, Guitar World, Kerrang! Magazine and has collaborated with Hot Topic on their "I Like Scary Movies Experience" feature. They have also appeared on podcasts such as The Boo Crew, The Fred Minnick Show and She Will Rock You. In June 2022 Dead Posey have made their debut on Kerrang! Radio's show Fresh Blood hosted by Alex Baker and were picked as The Featured Artist Of The Week.

Influences 
The band has cited Garbage, Nine Inch Nails, The Kills, Nirvana, Hole, Marilyn Manson, Depeche Mode, Rob Zombie and PJ Harvey as musical influences and David Lynch, Edgar Allan Poe and Salvador Dalí as artistic influences.

References 

Rock music groups from California
Musical groups established in 2017
Musical groups from Los Angeles
2017 establishments in California
Sumerian Records artists